Samuel Kwong (born January 1, 1998 in Pleasanton, California) is an American sabre fencer. He is a multiple-time national champion.

Achievements 

Kwong held the national #1 rank in each concluding year of Youth-10, Youth-12, and Youth-14. Altogether he won 10 North American Cup top-8 finalist medals between 2009 and 2013—including 3 gold and 3 bronze. In 2013 he won the Youth-14 National Championship in Columbus, Ohio, and in 2016 he won the Division I-A National Championship in Dallas, Texas.

He was the youngest male sabre fencer in the United States with an A rating in the 2012-2013 season and the youngest men's sabre fencer to represent United States internationally in the 2012-2013 season, at 14 years old winning United States's first medal for the season at the 2012 Cadet European Circuit in Konin, Poland.

He won an Under-17 bronze medal at the 2013 Junior Olympics in Baltimore, Maryland and as team captain an Under-19 team gold medal at the 2015 Junior Olympics in Richmond, Virginia.

At the 2016 USA Fencing Summer Nationals in Dallas, Texas, Kwong won three medals in a row, becoming the only fencer to have won three medals on three consecutive days in Junior and Senior national events. He won bronze in the Junior Men's Saber Challenge, gold in the Division I-A Men's Saber National Championship, and bronze in the Division I Men's Saber Challenge.

As a freshman for Stanford he won gold at the 2017 NCAA Western Regional Championships. He did not compete in his sophomore year. As a junior he returned and won another gold at the 2019 NCAA Western Regional Championships.

Personal 
He is the son of Raymond and Emma Kwong and the younger brother of Princeton Kwong, an American national champion figure skater.

References 

1998 births
American male sabre fencers
Living people
People from Pleasanton, California
People from Los Altos Hills, California
American sportspeople of Chinese descent